Ally Marie Venable (born April 7, 1999 in Kilgore, Texas) is an American blues rock guitar player, singer, and songwriter. She is the 2014, 2015 ETX Music awards female guitar player of the year, and she and her band were the ETX Music Awards 2015, 2016 blues band of the year.

Ally Venable was just 14 when she released her debut EP, Wise Man (2013), which earned her a reputation as a rising star in the Lone Star State's blues community.

Venable's third album, No Glass Shoes, with Connor Ray Music finished at number 16 in the RMR Electric Blues Charts for 2016. Venable is touted a must see act for under-30-year-olds by America's Blues Scene. Her second album, Puppet Show, debuted at No. 7 in the Billboard Blues Albums Chart. The album Texas Honey was released in 2019; video directed by John Chambers.

In 2019, Venable was a third of Ruf Records Blues Caravan 2019, who played over 60 shows across Europe. She toured with Finland's Ina Forsman and the Serbian Katarina Pejak.

She resides in Kilgore, Texas, United States.

Discography
 No Glass Shoes (2016)
 Puppet Show (2018)
 Texas Honey (2019)
 Heart of Fire (2021)

References

1999 births
Living people
Blues rock musicians
American blues guitarists
21st-century American women guitarists
21st-century American guitarists